Savadeh (also Romanized as Savādeh and Sovādeh; also known as Suvādah) is a village in Howmeh-ye Gharbi Rural District, in the Central District of Ramhormoz County, Khuzestan Province, Iran. At the 2006 census, its population was 42, in 7 families.

References 

Populated places in Ramhormoz County